Camp Aranu'tiq is a sleepaway camp for transgender children. It is operated by Harbor Camps, Inc., a nonprofit organization that runs camps for children and youth from marginalized populations, including those with dwarfism and craniofacial abnormalities. The camp is located in New Hampshire.

History
Camp Aranu'tiq was founded in 2009 by Nick Teich, a transgender man who had been asked to stop working at a sleepaway camp as a result of his transition. He realized that transgender children would go through the same issue of being kept out of gender-segregated spaces and thought that they should have a place where they felt completely comfortable.

The geographic location of the camp is only disclosed to campers due to safety concerns.

The name "Aranu'tiq" is a Chugach word for people who were thought to embody both a female and male spirit, also known in English as two-spirit. In that culture, Aranu'tiq people were considered lucky.

In 2015, Caitlyn Jenner visited and blogged about the camp, which was featured on an episode of her reality show, I Am Cait.

Notable campers
Jazz Jennings, activist
Nicole Maines, actress

References

External links
 Camp Aranu'tiq website
Harbor Camps website

Non-profit organizations based in the United States
LGBT youth organizations based in the United States
Aranu'tiq
Aranu'tiq
Transgender organizations in the United States
2009 establishments in California
LGBT in New Hampshire